The West Terrace Cemetery is South Australia's oldest cemetery, first appearing on Colonel William Light's 1837 plan of Adelaide.  The  site is located in Park 23 of the Adelaide Park Lands just south-west of the Adelaide city centre, between West Terrace, Anzac Highway, Sir Donald Bradman Drive and the Seaford and Belair railway lines. Originally known as the Adelaide Public Cemetery, it is divided into a number of sections for various communities and faiths, including two Catholic areas, as well as Jewish, Afghan, Islamic and Quaker sections.

History
The Adelaide Park Lands were laid out by Colonel William Light in his design for the city. Originally, Light reserved 2,300 acres for a park, and a further  for a public cemetery.

Throughout much of its early history the West Terrace Cemetery was plagued with controversy and mismanagement. It was the subject of much public and religious debate and was many times under threat of closure. As early as the 1880s the size of the cemetery was considered insufficient to keep up with demand.

In 1843 the establishment of a Jewish burial area began the distinctive denominational division of the cemetery. In 1845 a Catholic cemetery was established on land adjacent the main public cemetery and in 1849 a third of the public cemetery was given over to the Church of England.

The Smyth Chapel was built in 1871 as a memorial to the Very Reverend Dr John Smyth, Vicar General, who lies buried in the crypt beneath the chapel. It was designed by E. J. Woods in the latter part of 1870 as a result of a competition conducted by the Smyth Memorial Fund and built by Peters and Jones for approximately 472 pounds.

Situated within the Catholic area, the foundation stone was laid on 18 December 1870 by the venerable Archdeacon Russell, Vicar General, and was officially opened and formally consecrated on 22 October 1871.

In 1902, the first crematorium in the southern hemisphere was built and began operating in 1903.  For the next 20 years, this was the only crematorium in Australia. A number of famous and important South Australians have been buried in the cemetery and since 2002, the site has been administered by the Adelaide Cemeteries Authority, which also controls a number of other cemeteries within the metropolitan area.

War graves

AIF Cemetery
With concerns from various patriotic associations about soldiers from the First World War without relatives being buried in unmarked graves in the cemetery, a deputation to the Minister of Public Works in February 1920 sought a "Soldiers Lot" not only for these soldiers but also those whose families wished to bury their "soldier loved ones" there. The minister set aside a half an acre of the Light Oval for this purpose, with a monument to be erected by public subscription and soldiers in unmarked graves to be re-interred there. The first burial was in March 1920 but with slow progress of public fund raising the area was not dedicated until Sunday 10 December 1922.

There are buried (at June 2014) 275 Commonwealth service personnel from both World Wars in West Terrace Cemetery whose graves are registered by the Commonwealth War Graves Commission.

Notable interments or cremations

 William and Ann Margaret Bickford, manufacturing chemists
 Arthur Seaforth Blackburn, military officer and Victoria Cross recipient from the First World War
 Abraham Tobias Boas, long serving Rabbi of Adelaide's Jewish congregation
 James Bonnin, London property developer
 Poltpalingada Booboorowie (Tommy Walker), a Ngarrindjeri Aboriginal and popular Adelaide personality in the 1890s
 Charles Campbell, early settler, pastoralist and founder of Campbelltown
 Charles Chewings, geologist and anthropologist
 Sir Dominick Daly, 7th Governor of South Australia
 Phillip Davey, Victoria Cross recipient from the First World War
 J. Matthew Ennis, academic organist and pianist
 Boyle Travers Finniss, settler, soldier, surveyor and the first Premier of South Australia
 Thomas Gilbert, early pioneer and the colony's first Post Master General
 Percy Grainger, international musician and composer
 Charles Beaumont Howard, South Australia's first colonial chaplain
 Reginald Roy Inwood, Victoria Cross recipient from the First World War
 Jorgen Christian Jensen, Danish-born Victoria Cross recipient from the First World War
 Charles Kingston, a Premier of South Australia and a founding member of Australian Federation
 Carl Linger, musician and composer of Song of Australia
 Philip Levi, early settler and pastoralist
 John McPherson, first leader of the South Australian division of the Australian Labor Party
 Frederick Metters, founder of oven and stove manufacturing business that became Metters Limited
 Sir John Morphett (along with other members of his family), early settler, pastoralist and businessman
 Arthur Edward Rossiter, founder of footwear manufacturer, Rossi Boots
 Richard Gilbert Symonds, Surveyor for Colonel Light
 Augusta Zadow, female suffragette and early trade unionist
 The unknown identity known as The Somerton Man

References

External links

 Official West Terrace Cemetery site
 Burial records of West Terrace Cemetery
 Information and photos of historic graves
 West Terrace Cemetery – Billion Graves
 

1837 establishments in Australia
Cemeteries in South Australia
Commonwealth War Graves Commission cemeteries in Australia
South Australian Heritage Register
Adelaide Park Lands